Anne W. Burrell (born September 21, 1969) is an American chef, television personality, and former instructor at the Institute of Culinary Education. She is the host of the Food Network show Secrets of a Restaurant Chef and co-host of Worst Cooks in America. She was also one of the Iron Chefs, Mario Batali's sous chefs in the Iron Chef America series and appears on other programs on the network such as The Best Thing I Ever Ate. She was a contestant on the fourth season of The Food Network competition show, The Next Iron Chef Super Chefs being eliminated in episode 6. She was also a contestant on the first season of Chopped All-Stars Tournament, winning the "Food Network Personalities" preliminary round to advance to the final round, where she placed second runner up to Nate Appleman (winner) and Aarón Sanchez. In 2015, Burrell won the fourth installment of the Chopped All-Stars tournament winning $75,000 for the Juvenile Diabetes Research Foundation. She also hosted the series Chef Wanted with Anne Burrell in 2012–2013.

Early life and education
Burrell was born September 21, 1969, in Cazenovia, New York. She attended Canisius College in Buffalo and graduated with a Bachelor of Arts (BA) degree in English and Communications in 1991.

A year later, Burrell enrolled at the Culinary Institute of America, eventually graduating in 1996 with an Associate in Occupational Studies (A.O.S.).  She also studied at the Italian Culinary Institute for Foreigners in Asti in the Piedmont region.

Career

Restaurants
After the ICIF experience, Burrell remained in Italy, working in various restaurants for nine months. She worked at La Bottega del '30, a small restaurant in Tuscany with one seating each night.

Burrell returned to the U.S. as a sous chef at Felidia, owned by celebrity chef Lidia Bastianich.  She became the chef at Savoy, a small prix fixe dining room. After Savoy, Burrell began teaching at the Institute of Culinary Education. Lidia Bastianich's son and restaurateur, Joseph Bastianich, and Chef Mario Batali named Burrell the chef for Italian Wine Merchants, their New York wine store.  The Batali connection would further propel her career.

She later became the executive chef of Centro Vinoteca, an Italian restaurant in New York City's West Village area which opened in 2007. She left the restaurant in September 2008 due to her busy schedule and many commitments.  The departure also meant that she would not start at Gusto Ristorante, as both of the restaurants are part of Mangia Hospitality Group. Burrell planned to open her first restaurant in 2010 in New York City. Burrell opened her restaurant, Phil & Anne's Good Time Lounge, in Brooklyn in spring 2017, though as of April 2018, the restaurant has closed.

Television
In 2005, Iron Chef Mario Batali asked Burrell to serve as one of his sous chefs, along with chef and restaurateur Mark Ladner, for a pilot taping of Food Network's Iron Chef America series. She continued to serve as his sous chef during his tenure with the show.

Burrell's Food Network series Secrets of a Restaurant Chef debuted June 29, 2008. In 2009, she appeared on another Food Network show, The Best Thing I Ever Ate, in which chefs recount their favorite dishes.

In 2010, Burrell and Chef Beau MacMillan hosted a Food Network reality series named Worst Cooks in America. Burrell and her co-host lead contestants through a "culinary boot camp" on their journey to become better cooks. The first season premiered on January 3, 2010. Chef Burrell won the challenge when her recruit, Rachel Coleman, edged out MacMillan's recruit, Jenny Cross.

The second season premiered on January 2, 2011, with Chef MacMillan being replaced by Chef Robert Irvine. To raise the stakes, Irvine and Burrell made a side bet, in which Burrell risked losing her signature hair and Irvine risked going platinum. Chef Burell won both the competition and the side-bet, when her recruit, Joshie Berger, edged out Irvine's recruit, Georg Coleman.

Also in 2011, Burrell became the fourth runner up in the culinary competition, The Next Iron Chef on the Food Network, being eliminated in week six of the competition.

The third season of Worst Cooks in America premiered on February 12, 2012. Chef Bobby Flay was the new co-host/chef for season three. Chef Burrell again won the competition, when her recruit Kelli Powers edged out Flay's recruit, Vinnie Caligiuri. Season four started on February 17, 2013. Season four concluded with Flay's team finally defeating Burrell's team, when his recruit, Alina Bolshakova, edged out Burrell's recruit, Rasheeda Brown.

Other projects
In 2009, Burrell also appeared with fellow Food Network personality Guy Fieri on the Guy Fieri Roadshow.

Burrell, along with fellow Food Network personalities Sunny Anderson and Claire Robinson, appeared in the 2009 Macy's Thanksgiving Day Parade on the Food Network float.

Burrell hosted an 11-day Food Network cruise throughout the Mediterranean and across the Atlantic aboard the brand new Celebrity Silhouette in late 2011.

From June 2012 through October 2013, Burrell hosted Chef Wanted with Anne Burrell on the Food Network. The show ran for three seasons and 36 episodes.

Personal life
Burrell released a statement to the New York Post in 2012 confirming that she had been in a relationship with her girlfriend, chef Koren Grieveson, for two years after cookbook author Ted Allen seemingly outed her on a radio show. Burrell disputed the notion she had been outed, saying she had not kept her sexuality a secret.

On December 31, 2012, Burrell publicly tweeted that she was engaged to Koren Grieveson, but as of 2018, she was dating Stuart Claxton. On April 21, 2020, Anne announced that she and Claxton were engaged. The two married on October 16, 2021.

References

External links
 Burrell's Biography at the Institute for Culinary Education
 Burrell's former New York restaurant, Centro Vinoteca
 Burrell's Brooklyn restaurant, Phil & Anne's Good Time Lounge
 The Institute of Culinary Education – Anne W. Burrell
 Burrell's biography page at FoodNetwork.com

1969 births
American television chefs
Canisius College alumni
Food Network chefs
LGBT people from New York (state)
Living people
People from Cazenovia, New York
Culinary Institute of America Hyde Park alumni
American women chefs
Chefs from New York (state)
Iron Chef contestants
21st-century American LGBT people
21st-century American women
LGBT chefs